Schwanau is a municipality in the district of Ortenau in Baden-Württemberg in Germany.  It was formed in 1971/1972 with the merger of the villages of Allmannsweier, Nonnenweier, Ottenheim and Wittenweier.

References

External links
  
 Allmannsweier homepage 

Ortenaukreis